Iron Justice is a 1915 British silent crime drama film directed by Sidney Morgan and starring Sydney Fairbrother, Julian Royce and Alfred Drayton.

Cast
 Fanny Tittell-Brune as Margaret Brand
 Sydney Fairbrother as Mrs. O'Connor
 Julian Royce as Martin Brand
 Alfred Drayton as Frank Deakin
 Cecil Fletcher as Ronald O'Connor
 Marguerita Jesson as Phyllis Brand
 A. Harding Steerman as Jabez Cole
 Joan Morgan as Phyllis as a Child

References

Bibliography
 Low, Rachael. The History of British Film (Volume 3): The History of the British Film 1914 - 1918. Routledge, 2013.

External links

1915 films
1915 drama films
British silent feature films
British drama films
Films directed by Sidney Morgan
1910s English-language films
1910s British films
Silent drama films